Marino is a rural locality (a village) in Razdolyevskoye Rural Settlement, Kolchuginsky District, Vladimir Oblast, Russia. The population was 9 as of 2010.

Geography 
Marino is located on the Vorsha River, 32 km east of Kolchugino (the district's administrative centre) by road. Snegiryovo is the nearest rural locality.

References 

Rural localities in Kolchuginsky District